This is a list of notable people from Montreal.

A 

 Scott Abbott – co-inventor of Trivial Pursuit
 David Acer – magician and comedian, star of Mystery Hunters 
 Andrew Allan – Allan Shipping Line
 Sir Hugh Allan – Allan Shipping Line
 Martha Allan – founder of the Montreal Repertory Theatre
 Sir Montague Allan – businessman, donated the Allan Cup
 Paul Almond – film director
 Sidney Altman – Nobel Laureate in Chemistry
 Melissa Sue Anderson – American-Canadian actress. Known for her role as Mary Ingalls on Little House on the Prairie
 René Angélil – singer, actor, Celine Dion's husband and manager
 Richard Bladworth Angus – founder of the Canadian Pacific Railway
 Joel Anthony – NBA basketball player
 Alex Anthopoulos – general manager and president of baseball operations for the Atlanta Braves
 Gilles Archambault – novelist
 Francois Arnaud – actor
 Jay Aspin – former MP
 William H. Atherton – historian 
 Gabriel Aubry – model
 Melissa Auf der Maur – rock musician (Hole, The Smashing Pumpkins)
 Nick Auf der Maur – journalist, municipal politician
 Michel C. Auger – journalist
 Adam Azimov – film director
 David Azrieli – real estate developer; bulldozed the Van Horne Mansion

B 

 Ralph Backstrom – former NHL player
 René Balcer – television writer and producer, known for the US television show Law and Order
 Roger Barnes – professional wrestler
 Joseph Barsalou – businessman and politician
 Jay Baruchel – television and movie actor
 Doug Beardsley – poet and educator
 Philippe de Gaspé Beaubien – broadcasting, magazines
 Bianca Beauchamp – fetish fashion model
 Charles-Odilon Beauchemin – printer and bookseller
 Mathieu Beaudoin – football player
 Tanith Belbin – figure skater, Olympic silver medalist
 Louise Belcourt – artist
 Jean Béliveau – former NHL player
 Saul Bellow – novelist
 Meaghan Benfeito – diver
 Chris Benoit – pro wrestler, born in Montreal, raised in Edmonton, Alberta
 Eric Berne – psychiatrist; creator of Transactional Analysis; author of Games People Play
 André Besette – CSC Holy Cross Brother, "miracle worker of Montreal"
 Norman Bethune – physician, medical innovator, and political activist
 Tim Biakabutuka – former NFL football player, Carolina Panthers
 Charlie Biddle – Montreal Jazz pioneer, Juno Award winner
 Khem Birch – Montreal NBA Player edit by LMR-11
 Yannick Bisson – actor known for playing Det. Murdoch in Murdoch Mysteries and Jack in Sue Thomas: F.B. Eye
 Sacha Dean Biyan – fashion photographer, raised in Montreal, now based in New York
 Conrad Black – financier and newspaper magnate
 Sheila Blair – art historian
 Toe Blake – former NHL player and coach
 Valérie Blass – artist 
 Paul Bley – jazz pianist
 La Bolduc – real name Mary Travers, singer
 Yassine Bounou – footballer
 Chris Boucher –NBA Player
 Patrick Bordeleau – hockey player
 Daniel Borsuk – Plastic surgeon
 Mike Bossy – Hockey Hall of Fame member
 Eugenie Bouchard – tennis player
 Jean-François Bouchard – photographer and visual designer
 Louise Anne Bouchard – writer
 Maurice "Mom" Boucher – ex-leader of Hell's Angels (as of 2014)
 Henri Bourassa – political leader and publisher
 Robert Bourassa – former Quebec premier
 Pierre Bourque – mayor
 Raymond Bourque – former NHL player, Hockey Hall of Fame member
 Pierre Bouvier – frontman of Simple Plan; songwriter
 Scotty Bowman – hockey coach
 Justin Bradley – actor, based out of Montreal and Toronto, sometimes works in Los Angeles
 Tim Brady – guitarist, composer
 Glenda Braganza – Hollywood actress, 10.5: Apocalypse
 Adam Braz – former soccer defender
 Patrice Brisebois – NHL player, Montreal Canadiens
 Annie Brocoli – real name Annie Grenier, children's performer
 Martin Brodeur – NHL player, goaltender, New Jersey Devils
 Charles Bronfman – businessman and philanthropist
 Edgar Bronfman, Sr. – businessman
 Edward Bronfman – businessman, philanthropist, member of the Bronfman family
 Peter Bronfman – businessman, member of the Bronfman family
 Saidye Rosner Bronfman – philanthropist, wife of Samuel Bronfman
 Samuel Bronfman – liquor magnate
 Edwin Orion Brownell – pianist, vocalist
 Kim Brunhuber – journalist newscaster
 Geneviève Bujold – actress
 Hy Buller – former NHL All-Star player
 Mario Bunge – philosopher, Frothingham Chair of Logic and Metaphysics at McGill University
 Robin Burns – founder and owner, ITECH Hockey Equipment
 Ernie Butler – comedy club owner
 Gerard Butler – Scottish actor; lived here briefly as a baby 
 Win Butler – singer-songwriter

C 

 Jesse Camacho – actor
 Mark Camacho – actor
 Charles Sandwith Campbell – philanthropist, benefactor of Montreal
 Paul Cargnello – singer-songwriter
 Gerald Emmett Carter – former cardinal archbishop of Toronto 
 André Chagnon – cable TV, broadcasting, philanthropist
 Alex Chiasson  – NHL player for the Edmonton Oilers, 2018 Stanley Cup champion
 Serge Chapleau – political cartoonist
 Corinne Chaponnière – writer, journalist
 Robert Charlebois – singer-songwriter
 Gregory Charles – musician and radio host
 Dov Charney – entrepreneur and CEO of American Apparel
 Claude Charron – former politician, now TV host
 Patricia Chica – film and TV director 
 Emmanuelle Chriqui – actress
 Denny Chronopoulos – Canadian football player
 Terri Clark – country singer-songwriter
 Françoise de Clossey – pianist and organist
 Guy Cloutier – former artist manager
 Kim Cloutier – fashion model
 G. A. Cohen – political philosopher
 Leonard Cohen – poet and singer
 Mark Cohen – ophthalmologist, co-founder of LASIK MD
 Sidney M. Cohen – television director
 Steven Cojocaru – fashion critic
 John Colicos – actor
 Charles Comeau – drummer of Simple Plan and songwriter
 Phil Comeau – film and TV director
 Antonio Cordasco, Italian-Canadian migrant labour recruiter
 Ernest Cormier – engineer and architect
 Marc Costanzo – singer
 Corneille – singer
 Irwin Cotler – law professor, politician
 Jean Coutu – pharmacist
 Corey Crawford – NHL starting goaltender for the Chicago Blackhawks 
 Ron Crevier – former NBA basketball player
 Katalin Cseh – Hungarian politician
 Beto Cuevas – Chilean-Canadian lead singer of band La Ley
 Peter Cullen – voice actor (voice of Optimus Prime in the film Transformers)
 Elisha Cuthbert – actress
 Louis Cyr – strongman
 May Cutler – publisher and journalist; founder of Tundra Books; first Canadian woman to publish children's books; first woman to serve as Mayor of Westmount, Quebec

D 

 Samuel Dalembert – NBA basketball player, Philadelphia 76ers
 Peter Dalla Riva – football player, Montreal Alouettes
 Roméo Dallaire – senator, Lieutenant-General
 Vincent Damphousse – former NHL player
 Shawn Daniels – Canadian football player
 J. P. Darche – NFL football player, Seattle Seahawks
 Mathieu Darche – NHL player, Tampa Bay Lightning, Montreal Canadiens
 Françoise David – politician
 John Caswell Davis – politician
 Mitch Davis – film programmer, filmmaker, journalist
 Norman Dawe – sports executive
 Stéphane Demers – actor
 Bernard Derome – anchorman
 Pierre Desjardins – football player, Montreal Alouettes
 Roxane Desjardins – writer 
 André Desmarais – businessman
 Paul Desmarais, Sr. – businessman
 Paul Desmarais, Jr. – businessman
 David Desrosiers – bassist of Simple Plan and vocalist; born in Sept-Îles
 Sean Devine – playwright, actor, and politician
 Caroline Dhavernas – actress
 Céline Dion – singer
 Stéphane Dion – politician
 Xavier Dolan – actor, director, screenwriter, editor, costume director, producer
 Jacob Dolson Cox – U.S. soldier and politician
 Audrey Capel Doray – artist 
 Jean Doré – former mayor of Montreal
 Fifi D'Orsay – actress
 Lu Dort –  NBA Player
 William Dow – brewer
 Jean Drapeau – mayor of Montreal during Expo '67 and the 1976 Olympic Games
 Glen Drover – guitarist for Megadeth
 Shawn Drover – drummer for Megadeth
 Steve Dubinsky – former NHL player
 Gilles Duceppe – politician
 Jean Duceppe – actor
 Louis Dudek – poet
 Jack Dunham – animator, television commercial producer, designer of the St-Hubert rooster mascot
 Barbara Dunkelman – voice actress for Rooster Teeth
 Alexandre Dupuis – football player
 Domenic Di Rosa – actor

E 

 Keith Eaman – Canadian football player
 Iwan Edwards – conductor, Member of the Order of Canada
 Vic Emery – Olympic bobsleigh gold medalist
 Empire I – pop and dancehall singer, songwriter
 Anke Engelke – German comedian, born in Montreal
 Chad Erickson – Ringette coach
 Angelo Esposito – hockey player
 Sam Etcheverry – former CFL and NFL football quarterback, Montreal Alouettes, St. Louis Cardinals
 Terry Evanshen – former CFL football player, Montreal Alouettes, Calgary Stampeders
 Ken Evoy – founder of Sitesell; creator of SiteBuildIt!

F 

 Denise Filiatrault – actress and director
 Lara Fabian – operatic singer
 Mylène Farmer – singer
 Leylah Fernandez – tennis player
 David Fennario – playwright
 Maynard Ferguson – jazz trumpet player and bandleader
 Jennifer Finnigan – Hollywood actress
 Marc-André Fleury – ice hockey goalkeeper; three-time Stanley Cup champion with the Pittsburgh Penguins
 Louis-Joseph Forget – stockbroker, financier, statesman
 Rodolphe Forget – businessman, politician, philanthropist
 Samuel Fournier – former CFL football player, Montreal Alouettes, Edmonton Eskimos, Hamilton Tiger-Cats
 Kathleen Fox (born 1951) – flight instructor, air traffic controller, business executive
 René-Arthur Fréchet – architect
 Pauline Fréchette (1889–1943), poet, dramatist, journalist, Catholic nun
 David Freiheit – lawyer and YouTuber
 Gottfried Fuchs (1889–1972) – German-Canadian Olympic soccer player

G 

 Anne-France Goldwater – lawyer and TV court show
 Alfonso Gagliano – politician
 André Gagné – professor and scholar, Concordia University
 Éric Gagné – pitcher, Los Angeles Dodgers, Texas Rangers
 André Gagnon – composer, pianist
 Marc Gagnon – Olympic gold medal speed skater
 Marc-Antoine Gagnon – moguls skier
 Howard Galganov – anglophone rights activist, radio personality
 Céline Galipeau – anchorwoman
 Mavis Gallant – author
 Patsy Gallant – pop singer
 Mitch Garber – gaming, hotel executive, philanthropist, broadcaster
 Kathleen Gati – actress
 Arturo Gatti – professional boxer, world champion
 Daniel Gauthier – co-founder of the Cirque du Soleil
 James Gelfand – pianist, composer, arranger
 Yasmeen Ghauri – supermodel
 Ralph Gilles – designer of the Chrysler 300c
 Jessalyn Gilsig – actress
 Hilda Goldblatt Gorenstein (Hilgos) – artist and inspiration for the documentary I Remember Better When I Paint
 Jonathan Goldstein – author, humourist and radio producer
 John Gomery – jurist
 Brian Goodwin – biologist
 Adam Gopnik – writer, essayist
 Henry Gordon (1919–2009) – magician, journalist, CSI Fellow
 Huntley Gordon – actor
 Shaul Gordon (born 1994) – Canadian-Israeli Olympic sabre fencer
 Hugh Graham, 1st Baron Atholstan – newspaper publisher
 Stewart Francis Granger – former NBA basketball player
 W. R. Granger (William Rowen Granger) – president of the Montreal AAA, Canadian and Quebec Amateur Hockey Associations
 Howard Grant – former Canadian Olympics and Commonwealth boxer; trainer, UFC welterweight champion, Georges St-Pierre
 Otis Grant – Jamaican-born former WBO Middleweight boxing champion
 Hulda Regina Graser – customs house broker
 Harold Greenberg – movie producer, founder of Astral Media
 Frank Greenleaf – president of the Canadian and Quebec Amateur Hockey Associations
 Sylvain Grenier – WWE wrestler
 Irving Grundman – businessman, hockey executive
 Vladimir Guerrero Jr. – MLB for the Toronto Blue Jays
 Quincy Guerrier – college basketball player for the Oregon Ducks
 Philip Guston – painter and printmaker

H 

 Dayle Haddon – model and actress
 Marc-André Hamelin – pianist and composer
 Chris Haney – co-inventor of Trivial Pursuit
 Dan Hanganu – architect
 Louise Harel – politician
 Corey Hart – singer
 Doug Harvey – Hall of Fame ice hockey player
 Jacques Hébert – statesman
 Thomas Hellman – pop singer
 Carl Henry – singer
 Prudence Heward – Beaver Hall Group artist
 Alonzo Highsmith – former NFL football player
 Dave Hilton, Jr. – world champion boxer
 Matthew Hilton – world champion boxer
 David Julian Hirsh – actor
 Ian Hodgkinson – professional wrestler, lived in Montreal while in WCW
 Thomas William Holmes – winner of the Victoria Cross
 Herbert Samuel Holt – financier
 Steve Holt – jazz pianist, AC singer-songwriter
 William Hope – actor
 Anna Hopkins – actress
 Camillien Houde – former mayor of Montreal
 Alice Houghton – broker
 Anthony Housefather (born 1971) – Member of Canadian Parliament

I

 Norman Iceberg – singer-songwriter

J

 Marlene Jennings – politician
 René Jodoin – film animator and producer
 Daniel Johnson, Jr. – former premier of Quebec
 Oliver Jones – jazz pianist
 Sass Jordan – singer
 Kris Joseph – basketball player
 Robert Joy – actor
 Claude Jutra – filmmaker

K 

 Emilie Kahn – musician also known as Emilie & Ogden
Garry Kallos (born 1956) – wrestler and sambo competitor
 Tommy Kane – former NFL football player, Seattle Seahawks
 Daniel Kash – actor
 Kenneth Kaushansky – Dean of the Stony Brook University School of Medicine, hematologist, Master of the American College of Physicians
 Kaytranada – electronic musician, producer, DJ
 Michael A. Kelen – former judge of the Federal Court of Canada
 George Kennedy – owner of Montreal Canadiens hockey team
 Amir Khadir – physician and politician
 Kid Koala – DJ
 Franklin Kiermyer – drummer, composer
 Andy Kim – singer-songwriter
 A. M. Klein – author
 Naomi Klein – author and activist
 Leo Kolber – senator, de facto family member of the Bronfman family and empire
 Benjamin Kowalewicz – singer of Billy Talent
 Vanessa Kraven – professional wrestler
 David Kristian – electronic musician
 Sid and Marty Krofft – producers/creators of H.R. Pufnstuf, The Bugaloos, Sigmund and the Sea Monsters, Land of the Lost, The Lost Saucer
 Joseph Kruger – of Kruger Inc.

L 

 Florence La Badie – actress
 Michel Maray de La Chauvignerie – 18th century French military officer and interpreter
 Charline Labonté – hockey player, Canadian Olympic women's team, gold medalist in 2006, 2010, 2014
 Hubert Lacroix – CBC President and CEO
Oleg Ladik (born 1971) - Olympic wrestler
 Dany Laferrière – author
 Alexis Lafrenière – NHL player, New York Rangers
 Guy Lafleur – NHL player, Montreal Canadiens
 Corky Laing – musician
 Jon Lajoie – comedian
 Guy Laliberté – founder and CEO of Cirque de Soleil
 Paul Lambert – left guard, Montreal Alouettes
 Phyllis Lambert – architect and member of the Bronfman family
 Mado Lamotte – drag queen and author
 Jacques Lanctôt – FLQ member, convicted terrorist
 Louise Lanctôt – FLQ member, convicted terrorist
 Edmond Lapierre – former MPP
 Jean Lapierre – politician
 Éric Lapointe – CFL running back for the Montreal Alouettes
 Pierre Laporte – politician
 Georges Laraque – NHL player
 Ryan Larkin – animator
 Nicholas Latifi – racing driver currently driving for Williams Racing
 Lisa Lavie – singer-songwriter
 Irving Layton – poet, essayist, short story writer
 Jack Layton – politician, leader of the federal New Democratic Party
 Irina Lăzăreanu – fashion model
 Louise Lecavalier – dancer
 Vincent Lecavalier – NHL player
 Jos LeDuc – professional wrestler
 Ranee Lee – jazz singer
 Sébastien Lefebvre – guitarist of Simple Plan and vocalist
 Rachelle Lefevre – actress
 Aleksi Lehikoinen – Finnish rapper, better known by his stage name Gettomasa.
 Jean Leloup – musician
 Mario Lemieux (born 1965) – NHL player
 Vanessa Lengies – actress
 Guy A. Lepage – television personality
 Marc Lépine – mass murderer
 René Lépine – real-estate developer
 Chris Leroux – MLB pitcher (Florida Marlins, Pittsburgh Pirates)
 Pierre Leroux – novelist, journalist and screenwriter
 Jean Lesage – lawyer, politician
 Kris Letang – QMJHL player, NHL player, three-time Stanley Cup champion with the Pittsburgh Penguins
 André Éric Létourneau – intermedia artist, composer
 Jean-Louis Lévesque – stockbroker, horse racing builder
 Devon Levi – goaltender drafted by Florida Panthers in the 7th round, 212th overall in the 2020 NHL Entry Draft, current Northeastern Huskies, Canada men's national junior ice hockey team
 Shawn Levy – director and actor
 Jaclyn Linetsky – actress
 David Lipper – actor
 Liu Fang – musician
 Pascal Lochard – CFL player
 William Edmond Logan – geologist
 Jennifer Lonergan – educator, nonprofit executive, promoter of third-world women's craftmanship
 Colin Low – filmmaker
 Lunice – musician
 Roberto Luongo – NHL goaltender
 Yves A. Lussier – physician-scientist in translational bioinformatics
 Zoe Laurier – wife of Sir Wilfrid Laurier

M 

 Tom Maayan (born 1993) – Canada-born Israeli basketball player in the Israeli National League
 William C. Macdonald – tobacco manufacturer, philanthropist
 Danny Maciocia – CFL football coach
 Don Macpherson – journalist
 Nicolas Macrozonaris – sprinter, track and field
 Arnaud Maggs – artist, photographer
 Sean Patrick Maloney – Canadian-American politician and U.S. Representative for the state of New York since 2013
  Marc Miller – politician
 Jeanne Mance – founder of first hospital in North America, l'Hôtel-Dieu de Montréal, 1645
 Frederic Marcotte – poet and musician
 Rudolph A. Marcus – Nobel laureate of chemistry
 Lou Marinoff – philosopher at City College of New York
 Yann Martel – writer, Man Booker Prize 2002
 Paul Martin – former prime minister of Canada
 Russell Martin – baseball player for the Toronto Blue Jays
 Massari – singer
 Charles Mayer – journalist, sportsperson and politician
 John McCallum – politician
 John Wilson McConnell – businessman, publisher, philanthropist
 David Ross McCord – lawyer, philanthropist
 Kevin McDonald – actor/comedian/voice actor, member of The Kids in the Hall
 Thomas D'Arcy McGee – politician
 Molly McGlynn – film and television director and screenwriter
 Ken McGoogan – writer
 Duncan McIntyre – businessman
 Scott McKay – former city counsellor and leader of the Green Party of Quebec
 Patricia McKenzie – actress
 Norman McLaren – film animation pioneer
 Simon McTavish – businessman
 Juan Mendez – former NCAA basketball player, Niagara University
 Charles Meredith – president of the Montreal Stock Exchange
 Frederick Edmund Meredith – lawyer, chancellor of Bishop's University
 Vincent Meredith – first and last Baronet of Montreal; president of the Bank of Montreal
 William Collis Meredith – Chief Justice of the Superior Court of Quebec
 Luck Mervil – singer, actor
 Jim Miller – Canadian football player
 Brenda Milner – neuropsychologist
 Andrew Molson – businessman, member of the Molson family, eldest son of Eric Molson
 Eric Molson – brewer, businessman, member of the Molson family
 Geoff Molson – businessman, member of the Molson family, son of Eric Molson
 Hartland Molson – brewer, World War II fighter pilot, statesman, member of the Molson family
 John Molson – brewer, railway and steamship line builder, member of the Molson family
 Percival Molson – athlete, soldier, member of the Molson family
 Robert Moncel – commander of the 4th Canadian Armoured Brigade in the Second World War
 Édouard Montpetit – lawyer, economist, academic
 Henry Morgan – department store founder
 Henry Morgentaler – physician, advocate for women's rights to abortion
 Terry Mosher – editorial cartoonist
 Ben Mulroney – television host; son of Brian Mulroney
 Brian Mulroney – former prime minister of Canada
 Mila Mulroney – wife of the 18th prime minister of Canada, Brian Mulroney

N 
Ruba Nadda – producer
Pierre Nadeau – journalist, television presenter and producer
 Narcy – hip hop artist
 Émile Nelligan – poet
 Hillel Neuer – human rights lawyer, executive director UN Watch
 Kai Nielsen – naturalist philosopher at Concordia University
 Craig Norman – head basketball coach of McGill University Redmen; former basketball player for Concordia University

O 

 Erin O'Toole – politician, Conservative Party of Canada member
 Edmund Bailey O'Callaghan – politician, Parti patriote member
 Alexander Walker Ogilvie – miller, statesman
 Maryse Ouellet – glamour model and former WWE wrestler
 Caroline Ouellette – hockey player, Canadian women's Olympic team, gold medalist in 2002 and 2006

P 

 P. Reign – hip hop artist, born in Montreal, raised in Toronto
 Frank L. Packard – novelist
 Michel Pagliaro – musician
 Vernon Pahl – Canadian football player
 Jean Jacques Paradis – Commander of the Canadian Army
 Jessica Paré – actress
 Jacques Parizeau – politician, former premier of Quebec
 Julie Payette – scientist, astronaut
 Trevor W. Payne – founder and music director of the Montreal Jubilation Gospel Choir
 Cory Pecker (born 1981) – hockey player, right wing (EHC Visp)
 Érik Péladeau – businessman (Québecor)
 Pierre Péladeau – founder of Quebecor
 Pierre Karl Péladeau – CEO of Quebecor Media
 Wilfrid Pelletier – symphony conductor
 Dr. Wilder Penfield – pioneering neurosurgeon, founder of the Montreal Neurological Institute
 David De La Peralle – football player
 Missy Peregrym – actress
 Oscar Peterson – jazz pianist
 Autumn Phillips – former wife of Peter Phillips, eldest grandchild of Queen Elizabeth II
 Mary Pierce – tennis player
 André Pijet – artist
 Steven Pinker – linguist and evolutionary psychologist
 Susan Pinker – journalist and psychologist
 Christopher Plummer – actor
 Judes Poirier – university professor
 Antoni Porowski – chef, actor, and television personality
 Dick Pound – lawyer, Olympic Games executive
 Cheryl Pounder – hockey player, Canadian Olympic women's team, gold medalist in 2002 and 2006
 André Pratte – journalist, economist

Q 

 Nathalie Quagliotto – visual artist
 Sara Quin – musician

R 

Zotique Racicot – auxiliary bishop of Montreal from 1905 to 1915
 Jesse Rath (born 1989) – actor
 Meaghan Rath – actress
 Claude Raymond – former baseball player and coach
 Jade Raymond – video game designer and producer
 John Redpath – businessman, philanthropist
 Eliza Ann McIntosh Reid – social reformer, church worker, clubwoman
 Helen Richmond Young Reid – social worker
 Ginette Reno – singer
 Caroline Rhea – actress
 Heather Reisman – businesswoman 
 Mike Ribeiro – NHL player
 Henri Richard – former NHL player
 Maurice Richard – former NHL player
 Mordecai Richler – writer
 Vito Rizzuto – mobster
 Alphonso Theodore Roberts – political activist, cricketer
 Sam Roberts – musician
 Marc Robillard – musician, composer and songwriter
 Percy Rodrigues – actor
 Sasha Roiz (born 1973) – Israeli-born Canadian actor
 Cristina Rosato – actress
 Paul Rose – political figure
 Ari Rosenberg (born 1964) – Israeli basketball player
 Ethel Rosenfield (1910-2000) – sculptor
 Charlie J. Ross – vaudeville performer
 J.K.L. Ross – racehorse owner, philanthropist
 Albert S. Ruddy – film and television producer, known for producing The Godfather and Million Dollar Baby, which won him two Academy Awards for Best Picture. 
 Greg Rusedski (born 1973) – tennis player
 Claude Ryan – publisher, statesman
 Frank "Dunie" Ryan – mobster
 Rita Baga – real name is Jean-François Guèvremont. Drag Queen, was born in Boucherville.

S 

 Roméo Sabourin – SOE agent, WW II hero executed by the Nazis
 kwasi Songui – actor
 Moshe Safdie – architect, urban designer 
 Peter Sagar – multi-instrumentalist, known for his band HOMESHAKE and former touring guitarist for Mac DeMarco
 Martin St. Louis – NHL player
 Georges St-Pierre – professional MMA fighter 
Kim St-Pierre – hockey goaltender, Canadian Olympic women's team
 Lino Saputo – businessman
 Anne Savage – artist
 Marco Scandella – NHL player
 Paul Schoeffler – voice actor, actor
 Joseph A. Schwarcz – doctor of chemistry and professor at McGill University, formerly at Vanier College
 Cynthia Scott – Academy Award-winning director
 Frank Scott – scholar, poet, professor, lawyer
 Francis Alexander Caron Scrimger – winner of the Victoria Cross in World War I
 Mark Shainblum – comics writer and co-creator of Northguard
 Marla Shapiro – CTV medical reporter and physician
 William Shatner – actor, best known for playing Captain Kirk in Star Trek
 Douglas Shearer – Academy Award-winning motion picture sound engineer
 Norma Shearer – Academy Award-winning actress
 Eliezer Sherbatov (born 1991) – Canadian-Israeli ice hockey player
 Madeleine Sherwood – actress, played Mother Superior in The Flying Nun
 Karen Simpson – actress and fashion designer
 Jaspreet Singh – author
 Charles Sirois – telecommunications
 David Six – artist
 Jeff Skoll – Internet entrepreneur
 Donald Smith – railway executive
 George M. Smith – Lieutenant Governor of Wisconsin
 Larry Smith – former CFL football player; former president of the Montreal Alouettes
 Nahum Sonenberg – biochemist, professor at McGill University
 Wonny Song – classical concert pianist
 Benjamin St-Juste – American football player
 Kevin Steen – professional wrestler
 Sam Steinberg – supermarket founder
 Ralph M. Steinman – 2011 Nobel laureate in Physiology or Medicine
 George Stephen – banker, railway executive
Peter Stearns – historian, honorary knight
 Jeff Stinco – lead guitarist of Simple Plan
 P.J. Stock – NHL player
 Lance Stroll (born 1998) – Belgian-Canadian racing driver
 Lawrence Stroll (born 1959) – owner of Circuit Mont-Tremblant, Racing Point F1 Team, major shareholder/executive chairman in Aston Martin and father to Formula One driver Lance Stroll 
Howard Stupp (born 1955) - Olympic wrestler
 Bruny Surin – track and field athlete
 Robert Augustus Sweeney – only African American double recipient of the American Medal of Honor
 Sylvia Sweeney – former basketball player for the Canadian women's national team; TV journalist
 Jack W. Szostak – Nobel Laureate in Physiology or Medicine

T 

 Maxime Talbot – NHL player
 Ari Taub (born 1971), Olympic Greco-Roman wrestler
 Charles Taylor – philosopher emeritus at McGill
 José Théodore – NHL player
 David Thompson – explorer
 Ryan Thorne – head basketball coach for the McGill Martlets, former CIAU champion in basketball with Bishop's University
 Tiga – electronic musician, singer, DJ
 Josh Tordjman – NHL player
 Ibrahim Tounkara – Canadian football player
 Daniel Tracey – journalist, politician
 Gérald Tremblay – former mayor of Montreal
 Michel Tremblay – novelist, playwright
 Tony Tremblay – poet, radio personality
 Alexandre Trudeau – journalist; son of Pierre Trudeau, the former prime minister of Canada
 Justin Trudeau – Member of Parliament; 23rd prime minister of Canada, son of Pierre Trudeau, a former prime minister of Canada
 Pierre Trudeau (1919-2000) – 15th prime minister of Canada
 Sophie Grégoire Trudeau – spouse of the 23rd prime minister of Canada, Justin Trudeau.
 Alain Trudel – conductor
 Jean-Claude Turcotte – Roman Catholic cardinal
 Roxane Turcotte  – author of children's and youth literature
 George Tutunjian – performer of Armenian revolutionary songs
 Rachel Tyndale  –  pharmacogeneticist

U 

 David Usher – singer-songwriter

V 

 Maurice Vachon – also known as Mad Dog Vachon; wrestling champion
 Stevie Vallance – also known as Louise Vallance; singer, musician, actress, voice actress and director
 Ernie Vandeweghe – former NBA basketball player, New York Knicks
 Gino Vannelli – singer-songwriter
 Chris Velan – singer-songwriter
 Joe Veleno – NHL prospect for the Detroit Red Wings
 Jacques Vieau – fur trader and early Wisconsin settler
 Gilles Villeneuve – Formula One driver
 Jacques Villeneuve – Formula One driver (1997 World Champion); 1995 IndyCar champion; son of Gilles Villeneuve
 Claude Vivier – contemporary classical composer, ethnomusicologist and poet
 Marc-Édouard Vlasic – NHL player, currently playing for the San Jose Sharks
 Roch Voisine – singer

W 

 Martha Wainwright – singer-songwriter
 Rufus Wainwright – singer-songwriter
 Avi Wallerstein – ophthalmologist, co-founder of LASIK MD
 Amanda Walsh – actress
 Dwight Walton – professional basketball player, Canadian Olympian
 Ben Weider – co-founder of the IFBB (International Federation of BodyBuilders)
 Joe Weider – creator of the Mr. Olympia and Ms. Olympia bodybuilding contests
 William Weintraub – author, filmmaker
 Danny Wells – actor; played bartender on The Jeffersons and Luigi in The Super Mario Brothers Super Show
 Bill Wennington – former NBA basketball player, Chicago Bulls
 Max Werner – founder of Montreal Pastry, world class pastry chef
 Alissa White-Gluz – singer-songwriter; former vocalist of The Agonist; current vocalist of Arch Enemy
 Trevor C. Williams – former member of the Canadian national basketball team; philanthropist
 Cairine Wilson – first woman to serve in the Senate of Canada
 Joseph Wiseman – actor, known for playing Dr. Julius No in the first James Bond film Dr. No
 Karl Wolf – singer
 Bernie Wolfe (born 1951) – NHL hockey player
 William Workman – businessman and municipal politician
 Peter Worrell – former NHL player
 Aleksandra Wozniak – tennis player

X 
 Xue Yiwei – writer – Côte-des-Neiges

Y 

 Joel Yanofsky – writer
 Nikki Yanofsky – jazz singer
 Wayne Yearwood – former professional basketball player; Canadian Olympian

Z 

 Sami Zayn – professional wrestler currently signed to the WWE
 Larry "Rock" Zeidel (1928–2014) – NHL player
 Joel Zifkin – electric violinist, singer-songwriter
 David Zilberman – Olympic heavyweight wrestler
 Moses Znaimer – co-founder of Toronto's CityTV
 Mortimer Zuckerman – magazine editor, publisher, real estate tycoon

See also 
List of people from British Columbia
List of people from Calgary
List of people from Edmonton
List of people from Laval, Quebec
List of people from Ontario
List of people from Quebec
List of people from Quebec City
List of people from Toronto
List of people from Vancouver

References

Montrealers
People
Montreal